Bank of America Plaza, formerly Security Pacific Plaza, is a 55-story,  class-A office skyscraper on Bunker Hill, Los Angeles, California. It was completed in 1974 with the headquarters of Security Pacific National Bank, Capital Group Companies and Sheppard, Mullin, Richter & Hampton as its main tenants. The tower is the fifth tallest building in Los Angeles, and the 92nd-tallest building in the United States. In 2009 it had the highest assessed value of any office building in Los Angeles County. When it was constructed, Security Pacific Plaza was unique for Downtown Los Angeles, in that its four sides each faced true north, south, east and west.

From when it opened in 1974 until 1992, it bore the Security Pacific Bank logo. This logo was removed when Bank of America acquired Security Pacific Bank. Featured in several motion pictures, its plaza area was filmed as that of the adjacent "Peerless Building" to the Glass Tower in The Towering Inferno (which was set in San Francisco), as well as the lawyer's office in the film Pretty Woman, and as Tex Richman's office headquarters in The Muppets.  The tower was also used in establishing shots as the headquarters for the fictional company Denver-Carrington in the 1991 prime time soap opera ‘’Dynasty’’. The epilogue of Night of the Comet was filmed in the plaza, the tower having been prominently in the background of numerous scenes earlier in the film.

The building site is situated on  that features a formal garden with over 200 trees and three  waterfalls. In front of the main entrance is the  "Four Arches" sculpture by Alexander Calder.

See also
 List of tallest buildings in Los Angeles
List of tallest buildings in the United States

References

Bank of America buildings
Bank buildings in California
Buildings and structures in Downtown Los Angeles
Bunker Hill, Los Angeles
Skyscraper office buildings in Los Angeles
Brookfield Properties buildings
Office buildings completed in 1974
1974 establishments in California
1970s architecture in the United States
Leadership in Energy and Environmental Design gold certified buildings